Notsi may be,

Notsi language, New Ireland
Leslie Notši